Luca Barilla (born May 12, 1960 in Milan) is an Italian billionaire businessman, and the deputy chairman of Barilla Group, the world's largest pasta company, which is 85% owned by Luca, his brothers Guido and Paolo, and a sister.

Barilla took his first steps in the family business in 1980 and, four years later, in 1984, after completing his studies in the United States and the military service in the Italian military police force Carabinieri, he has been enrolled as product manager. 
He carries out the professional training in the Company, first at the subsidiary Barilla France in Paris and then in the American headquarters of the Group.

In 1987, Luca Barilla became a member of the family Group's Board of Directors, of which he was elected Deputy Chairman the following year. He has been holding this position since that date, being the current Deputy Chairman of the Group.

In 1997 Luca Barilla was appointed President of GranMilano, a leader company in the production of confectionery products. He held this position until 2008, when the brand was sold.

References

1960 births
Luca
Italian billionaires
Businesspeople from Milan
Living people
Businesspeople from Parma